Elia Karina Rivero Molnar (born October 20, 1985 in Valera, Venezuela) is a Venezuelan model and beauty pageant contestant. She was the Elite Model Look Venezuela winner for 2003 and was the official representative of Venezuela to the Elite Model Look International 2003 pageant held in Singapore on November 8, 2003. Rivero was also first runner up in the Elite Model Latino 2003 pageant held in May, 2003.

She represented the Amazonas state in the Miss Venezuela 2008 pageant, on September 10, 2008 and placed in the 10 semifinalists.

References

1985 births
Living people
Venezuelan female models
People from Valera